Frank R. Strozier Jr. (born June 13, 1937) is a jazz alto saxophonist.

Strozier was born in Memphis, Tennessee, where he learned to play piano. In 1954, he moved to Chicago, where he performed with Harold Mabern, George Coleman, and Booker Little (like Strozier, they were from Memphis). He recorded with the MJT + 3 from 1959 to 1960 and led sessions for Vee-Jay Records.

After moving to New York, Strozier was briefly with the Miles Davis Quintet in 1963 (between the tenures of Hank Mobley and George Coleman) and also gigged with Roy Haynes. After moving to Los Angeles, he worked with Chet Baker, Shelly Manne, and the Don Ellis big band. Returning to New York in 1971, he worked with Keno Duke's Jazz Contemporaries, the New York Jazz Repertory Company, Horace Parlan, and Woody Shaw.

Discography

As leader
 Fantastic Frank Strozier (Vee-Jay, 1960)
 Long Night (Jazzland, 1961)
 March of the Siamese Children (Jazzland, 1962)
 Remember Me (SteepleChase, 1977)
 What's Goin' On (SteepleChase, 1978)
 Cool, Calm and Collected (Vee Jay, 1993)

As sideman
With Roy Haynes
 Cymbalism (New Jazz, 1963)
 People (Pacific Jazz, 1964)

With Shelly Manne
 Manne–That's Gershwin! (Capitol, 1965)
 Boss Sounds!  (Atlantic, 1966)
 Daktari (Atlantic, 1967)
 Jazz Gunn (Atlantic, 1967)
 Perk Up (Concord Jazz, 1976)

With MJT+3
 Make Everybody Happy (Vee Jay, 1959)
 MJT + 3 (Vee Jay, 1961)

With Oliver Nelson
 Live from Los Angeles (Impulse!, 1967)
 Black, Brown and Beautiful (Flying Dutchman, 1970)

With others
 Booker Little, Booker Little 4 and Max Roach (1958)
 Walter Perkins, Walter Perkins' MJT+3 (Vee Jay, 1959)
 Johnny Griffin, The Big Soul-Band (Riverside, 1960)
 The Young Lions, The Young Lions  (Vee Jay, 1960)
 Sam Jones,  Down Home (Riverside, 1962)
 Booker Ervin, Exultation! (Prestige, 1963)
 McCoy Tyner, Today and Tomorrow (Impulse!, 1964)
 Chet Baker, Baby Breeze (Limelight, 1965)
 Don Ellis, Autumn (Columbia, 1968)
 The Three Sounds and the Oliver Nelson Orchestra, Coldwater Flat (Blue Note, 1968)
 Steve Allen, Soulful Brass (Flying Dutchman, 1969)
 Sonny Stitt, Dumpy Mama (Flying Dutchman, 1975)
 Horace Parlan, Frank-ly Speaking (SteepleChase, 1977)
 Woody Shaw, Little Red's Fantasy (Muse, 1978)
 Louis Hayes, Variety Is the Spice (Gryphon, 1979)
 Stafford James, Stafford James Ensemble (Red, 1979)

References

External links 
 Comprehensive and regularly updated Frank Strozier Discography
 Compositions of Frank Strozier

1937 births
Jazz alto saxophonists
Living people
Musicians from Memphis, Tennessee
African-American jazz musicians
American jazz saxophonists
American male saxophonists
SteepleChase Records artists
Vee-Jay Records artists
21st-century American saxophonists
Jazz musicians from Tennessee
21st-century American male musicians
American male jazz musicians
21st-century African-American musicians
20th-century African-American people